Lepidophorus inquinatus is a species of broad-nosed weevil in the family Curculionidae. It is found in North America.

References

Further reading

External links

 

Entiminae
Beetles described in 1852